Raymond Kanelba (1897–1960), also known as Rajmund Kanelba, was a 20th-century Polish painter.

He was born in Warsaw and educated there as well as in Vienna and Paris. He was strongly influenced by the école de Paris but with rather realistic and anti-impressionist style. In 1926 his works were on display in Salon des Indépendants and Salon d'Automne and in 1952 he had a large exposition of his paintings in New York City.

Rajmund Kanelba lived most of his life in France but died in London.

Sources
Stair Galleries bio of Kanelba

1897 births
1960 deaths
20th-century Polish painters
20th-century Polish male artists
Polish male painters
Polish emigrants to France